= Avundy =

Russian masculine given name

Avundy (Russian: Аву́ндий) is an old and rare Russian Christian male first name. It is derived from the Latin word abundo, meaning to be in abundance.

The patronymics derived from "Avundy" are "Аву́ндиевич" (Avundiyevich), "Аву́ндьевич" (Avundyevich; both masculine); and "Аву́ндиевна" (Avundiyevna), "Аву́ндьевна" (Avundyevna; both feminine).
